Deutschlands MeisterKoch is a German cooking competition television show that was broadcast in 2010 by Sat.1. It is based on the original UK show MasterChef. The winner of the first season was Jessica from Saarbrücken.

Due to low ratings the show was moved from its initial time slot on Friday evening to Saturday afternoon. It was not picked up for a second season.

Seasons

Deutschlands MeisterKoch (2010)

Top 12

MasterChef Germany (2016)

Top 16

Judges 
 Tim Raue
 Thomas Jaumann
 Nelson Müller

References

External links 
 

2010 German television seasons
Germany
2010 German television series debuts
2010 German television series endings
German-language television shows
Sat.1 original programming
German television series based on British television series